Find the Sun is the second studio album by American indie musician and former Dirty Projectors member Deradoorian. It was released by Anti- on September 18, 2020.

Background
Find the Sun was announced on March 10, 2020 with an initial release date of May 22, 2020. Also announced were Deradoorian's 2020 tour dates, in which she planned to join Stereolab on their 2020 reunion tour. Deradoorian began writing most of the songs in the summer of 2020, with some songs having been started in the previous summer. The writing for all songs was completed in the summer of 2020. The creation process for the album started in Rockaway, Queens. The album was then recorded at Panoramic House, a recording studio in Marin County, California. While the album was still in development, Deradoorian attended a Vipassana retreat in complete silence for ten days, which led Samer Ghadry and Dave Harrington to join the track as collaborators.

Release
The lead single, "Saturnine Night", was released on March 10, 2020. A second single, "Monk's Robes", was released on April 21, 2020, alongside the announcement of the album's postponement and the cancellation of her tour due to the COVID-19 pandemic. "It Was Me" was released next on May 19, 2020. A fifth single, "Mask of Yesterday", was released on August 5, 2020.

Critical reception

Find the Sun was met with generally positive reviews. At Metacritic, which assigns a normalized rating out of 100 to reviews from mainstream publications, the album received an average score of 76, based on nine reviews. Aggregator AnyDecentMusic? gave it 7.4 out of 10, based on their assessment of the critical consensus. Album of the Year assessed the critical consensus as 78 out of 100, based on eleven reviews.

In a five star review for The Sydney Morning Herald, Barnaby Smith compared the album to the works of Can, Trees, Wildbirds & Peacedrums, Pink Floyd, and Gil Scott-Heron. John Aizlewood of Mojo was more tepid in his review, noting 'it doesn't work when she wails and chants her way through the closing "Sun"... the climax to "Red Den" is a choral feast, and "It Was Me" is a slab of surprisingly crisp pop'.

Accolades

Track listing

Personnel
Credits adapted from liner notes.

 Angel Deradoorian – vocals, flute, guitar, bass guitar (1, 4, 7, 9), synthesizer, production, design
 Samer Ghadry – drums, timpani, percussion, production, engineering
 Dave Harrington – bass guitar (2, 3, 5, 8, 10), electronics, conga, percussion
 Adam Gonsalves – mastering
 Sean Stout – photography, design

References

External links
 

2020 albums
Anti- (record label) albums